The Christian Democratic Community (CDC) was an electoral political alliance of the Bolivian Socialist Falange, FSB; the National Association of Democratic Professions, ANPD and the Democratic Revolutionary Alliance, ADR.

The Christian Democratic Community was established in 1966, for the 1966 presidential and congressional elections. It presented as its presidential candidate Bernardino Bilbao Rioja (FSB) and Gonzalo Romero Álvarez (FSB), as vice-presidential candidate.

Notes

1966 establishments in Bolivia
Defunct political party alliances in Bolivia
Political parties established in 1966
Political parties with year of disestablishment missing